Sebastian Ramírez may refer to:
Sebastián Ramírez de Fuenleal (1490-1547), Spanish bishop
Sebastián Ramírez (footballer, born 1992), Uruguayan footballer
Sebastian Ramírez (footballer, born 2000), Argentine footballer